Heath Blackgrove (born 5 December 1980 in Oamaru) is a New Zealand former professional racing cyclist, who currently works as a directeur sportif for UCI Continental team .

Major results

1999
 1st  Time trial, National Under-23 Road Championships
2000
 2nd Le Race
2001
 1st  Time trial, National Under-23 Road Championships
2002
 1st Le Race
 3rd Overall Tour of Southland
2003
 1st Team pursuit, UCI Track Cycling World Cup Classics, Sydney
 National Road Championships
1st  Road race
2nd Time trial
 1st Stage 1 Tour of Southland
 7th Omloop van het Houtland
2004
 National Road Championships
1st  Road race
1st  Time trial
 1st Overall Tour de Vineyards
1st Stage 2
 2nd Overall UAE International Emirates Post Tour
1st Prologue
 2nd Challenge de Hesbaye
 3rd Archer Grand Prix
 10th Overall Tour of Wellington
1st Stage 1 (TTT)
 10th Overall Circuit des Ardennes
2005
 1st Overall Tour de Vineyards
1st Stages 2 & 3
 1st Gistel
 2nd Overall Le Triptyque des Monts et Châteaux
 2nd Chantonnay
 2nd Grand Prix Criquielion
 2nd Tour du Jura
2006
 National Track Championships
1st  Team pursuit
3rd Madison
 1st Overall San Dimas Stage Race
 1st Overall Vuelta a Valencia Stage Race
1st Stage 2
 1st Central Valley Classic TT
 1st Stage 1 Central Valley Classic
 2nd Overall Tour de Vineyards
1st Stage 4
 2nd Overall Fitchburg Longsjo Classic
2007
 1st Overall Tour de Vineyards
1st Stages 3 & 4
 1st Stage 6 Mount Hood Classic
 2nd Road race, National Road Championships
2008
 1st Overall Tobago Cycling Classic
1st Stage 3
 1st Tx Tough Grand Prix
 2nd Road race, National Road Championships
 2nd Overall Tour de Vineyards
 3rd Overall Tour of Southland
1st Prologue (TTT)
2009
 1st Overall Tour of Southland
 1st Athens Twilight Criterium
 1st Tx Tough Grand Prix II
 1st Stage 1 La Primavera at Lago Vista
2010
 4th Road race, National Road Championships
 4th Overall Tour of Wellington
2011
 1st Stage 2 La Primavera at Lago Vista
2012
 5th Bucks County Classic
2013
 1st Stage 1 La Primavera at Lago Vista
2014
 1st Rouge Roubaix
 1st Stage 2 Hotter'N Hell Hundred
 1st Stages 1 & 2 La Primavera at Lago Vista
2015
 1st Overall Valley of the Sun Stage Race
 1st Stage 2 La Primavera at Lago Vista
 8th The Reading 120
2017
 1st Stage 2 La Primavera at Lago Vista

References

External links
 

1980 births
Living people
New Zealand male cyclists
New Zealand track cyclists
Olympic cyclists of New Zealand
Cyclists at the 2004 Summer Olympics
Cyclists at the 2002 Commonwealth Games
Commonwealth Games competitors for New Zealand
Sportspeople from Oamaru